Katableps is a genus of spiders in the family Lycosidae. It was first described in 2011 by Jocqué, Russell-Smith & Alderweireldt. , it contains 3 species from Madagascar.

References

Lycosidae
Araneomorphae genera
Spiders of Madagascar